This article is about the particular significance of the year 1822 to Wales and its people.

Incumbents
Lord Lieutenant of Anglesey – Henry Paget, 1st Marquess of Anglesey 
Lord Lieutenant of Brecknockshire – Henry Somerset, 6th Duke of Beaufort
Lord Lieutenant of Caernarvonshire – Thomas Bulkeley, 7th Viscount Bulkeley (until 3 June); Thomas Assheton Smith (from 18 July)
Lord Lieutenant of Cardiganshire – William Edward Powell
Lord Lieutenant of Carmarthenshire – George Rice, 3rd Baron Dynevor 
Lord Lieutenant of Denbighshire – Sir Watkin Williams-Wynn, 5th Baronet    
Lord Lieutenant of Flintshire – Robert Grosvenor, 1st Marquess of Westminster 
Lord Lieutenant of Glamorgan – John Crichton-Stuart, 2nd Marquess of Bute 
Lord Lieutenant of Merionethshire – Sir Watkin Williams-Wynn, 5th Baronet
Lord Lieutenant of Montgomeryshire – Edward Clive, 1st Earl of Powis
Lord Lieutenant of Pembrokeshire – Richard Philipps, 1st Baron Milford
Lord Lieutenant of Radnorshire – George Rodney, 3rd Baron Rodney

Bishop of Bangor – Henry Majendie 
Bishop of Llandaff – William Van Mildert
Bishop of St Asaph – John Luxmoore 
Bishop of St Davids – Thomas Burgess

Events
April - Launch of the Chester Cymmrodorion Society.
13 June - William Lloyd climbs Boorendo in the Himalayas.
12 August - St David's College (now the University of Wales, Lampeter) is founded by Thomas Burgess, Bishop of St David's.
Beginning of "" ("War of the Little Englishman"), a dispute over enclosures in Pembrokeshire.
Horse-drawn trams begin a passenger service between Tredegar and Newport.
Sir Thomas Phillipps, 1st Baronet, establishes a private printing press in Broadway Tower on his estate at Middle Hill in Worcestershire.

Arts and literature

New books
John Hughes - An Essay on the Ancient and Present State of the Welsh Language
William Owen Pughe - Hu Gadarn
John Montgomery Traherne - Lists of Knights of the Shire of Glamorgan
Y Cymmrodor (first, unnumbered volume)

Music
Stephen Llwyd - "Caerllyngoed" (hymn tune)

Births
2 January – Basil Jones, bishop (d. 1897)
2 March – Michael D. Jones, Tad y Wladfa, founder of the Welsh settlement in Patagonia (d. 1898)
3 August – John Rhys Morgan, minister, teacher and poet (d. 1900)
25 September - William Bloomfield Douglas, colonial governor (d. 1906)
4 October - Charles Williams-Wynn, politician (d. 1896) 
27 October – Aneurin Jones (Aneurin Fardd), writer (d. 1904)
15 December – Edward Stephen (Tanymarian), musician (d. 1885)
22 December - John Roberts (Ieuan Gwyllt), musician and minister (d. 1877)

Deaths
30 March – David Thomas (Dafydd Ddu Eryri), poet, 62
9 April – William Jones, Welsh-descended Governor of Rhode Island, 68
22 May – Samuel Homfray, industrialist, 59
5 June 
(near Durham) - Stephen Kemble, actor, brother of Sarah Siddons, 64
George Lewis, theologian, 59
25 September – John Henry Bowen, American politician of Welsh descent, 42
22 December – Sarah Wesley (née Gwynne), widow of Charles Wesley, 96

References

 Wales